Sealand Helicopters was a helicopter services company, specializing in transportation to offshore oil and gas platforms.

History
The company was founded by industrialist Craig Dobbin in February 1977 in St. John's, Newfoundland as a charter airline. Its headquarters were at St. John's International Airport. The company first entered the offshore transport industry in 1979, providing helicopters mainly in support of offshore oil and gas operations. By the early 1980s, Sealand operated a fleet of over 30 helicopters. 

In 1987, Dobbin headed a group of investors organized under the name Canadian Holding Company which purchased Okanagan Helicopters, Viking Helicopters, and Toronto Helicopters and merged them with Sealand Helicopters, to form CHC Helicopter.

Fleet
 12 - Bell 206B 
 8 - Aérospatiale AS 332
 5 - Bell 206L
 3 - Aérospatiale AS 355
 2 - Sikorsky S-76A 	
 1 - Aérospatiale	AS 350	
 1 - Bell 205
 1 - Bell 47
 1 - Messerschmitt Bo 105
 1 - Sud Aviation SA 330J

See also 
 List of defunct airlines of Canada

Gallery

Defunct helicopter airlines
Regional airlines of Atlantic Canada
Airlines established in 1977
Companies based in St. John's, Newfoundland and Labrador
Helicopter operators
1977 establishments in Newfoundland and Labrador
Defunct airlines of Canada
Airlines disestablished in 1987
1987 disestablishments in Newfoundland and Labrador
Defunct companies of Newfoundland and Labrador
Canadian companies disestablished in 1987
Canadian companies established in 1977